Capitellida is an order of annelids belonging to the class Polychaeta.

Families:
 Arenicolidae Johnston, 1835
 Capitellidae Grube, 1862
 Maldanidae Malmgren, 1867

References

Annelids